The Odd Fellows Hall in Baltimore, Maryland, United States, is a historic building that was the meeting place of the Independent Order of Odd Fellows fraternal organization, and is now an apartment building. It was built in 1891 and is a five bay structure featuring a central arched entrance with brownstone Romanesque columns and architraves. In the late 1970s, an adaptive reuse project retained most of its exterior architectural character while providing modern office space in the renovated interior.

Odd Fellows Hall was listed on the National Register of Historic Places in 1982.

References

External links
, including photo from 1984, at Maryland Historical Trust

Buildings and structures in Baltimore
Downtown Baltimore
Odd Fellows buildings in Maryland
Cultural infrastructure completed in 1893
Romanesque Revival architecture in Maryland
Clubhouses on the National Register of Historic Places in Baltimore
1893 establishments in Maryland